Prix Condorcet was instituted in 1993, by the Mouvement laïque québécois to honour a public personality who had worked for the defense of secularity and  freedom of thought. The name honours the Marquis de Condorcet, a philosopher of the Age of Enlightenment and one of the writers of the Declaration of the Rights of Man and of the Citizen.

 1993: Micheline Trudel, voluntary. 
 1994: Henry Morgentaler, defender of the right to abortion in Canada. 
 1995: Centrale des syndicats du Québec, trade union of teachers. 
 1996: Louise Laurin, founder of the Coalition for the deconfessionnalisation of the school system. 
 1997: Institut canadien de Montréal, liberal and anticlerical organization (1844-1880). 
 1998: All signatories of Refus Global. 
 1999: Duplessis Orphans Association. 
 2000: Jacques Hébert, senator and humanist of secularity. 
 2001: Pierre Bourgault, founder of Rassemblement pour l'Indépendance Nationale and free-thinker. 
 2002: Jacques Godbout and Jacques Mackay, former presidents of the Mouvement laïque de langue Française (MLF). 
 2003: Janette Bertrand, playwright. 
 2004: Rodrigue Tremblay, economist, politician and humanist. 
 2005: Paul Bégin, deputy and republican partisan. 
 2006: Daniel Baril, journalist and anthropologist, founder member and former president of the MLQ.
 2007: Yolande Geadah, essayist, public debater over immigration and religious issues.

Awards established in 1993
1993 in Canada
Culture of Quebec
Quebec awards